State Route 177 (SR 177) is a primary state highway in the U.S. state of Virginia. The state highway runs  from Interstate 81 (I-81) near Radford north to U.S. Route 11 (US 11) in Radford. SR 177 directly connects I-81 with the eastern part of the independent city of Radford, including Radford University.

Route description

SR 177 begins at a diamond interchange with I-81 southeast of Radford. The road continues south as SR 600 (Tyler Road) past Carilion New River Valley Medical Center. SR 177 heads northwest as Tyler Road, a four-lane divided highway. The state highway enters the city of Radford at its intersection with Rock Road. SR 177 continues as Tyler Avenue through the eastern part of the city. The state highway becomes a two-lane divided highway at the southern edge of the campus of Radford University. SR 177 follows the western edge of the university before reaching its northern terminus at US 11 (Main Street).

Major intersections

References

External links

Virginia Highways Project: VA 177

177
State Route 177
State Route 177